is an anime television series, created by Yoshiyuki Tomino, written by Ichirō Ōkouchi, and featuring character designs by Yoshihiro Nakamura, Kinu Nishimura and Ken'ichi Yoshida. The series ran from September 7, 2002 to March 22, 2003 on Japan's WOWOW network, spanning a total of 26 episodes. Following the 2012 closure of Bandai Entertainment, Sunrise announced at Otakon 2013, that Sentai Filmworks has acquired Overman King Gainer, along with a handful of other former BEI titles.

Plot
The setting and plot of Overman King Gainer are a loose adaptation of the novel series La Compagnie des glaces by the French writer Georges-Jean Arnaud. After an environmental cataclysm, much of the world's population retreated into domed cities called Domepolis, which are run by an organization known as "London IMA" (International Management Authority) and its police arm, "Saint Regan". However, the Domepoli are maintained and supplied by privatized firms such as the "Siberian Railroad Company". Many years have passed since the cataclysm, and many have begun to believe that the world environment has recovered sufficiently enough for humans to begin living outside Domepoli. As such, some inhabitants begin planning Exoduses to leave these cities and to resettle their ancestral homelands. However, this does not sit well with the London IMA or the private firms that monopolize trade between the Domepoli, as the loss of people would not only lead to a loss in tax and trade revenue, but if the Exodus were to be successful, it would show the people that it was no longer necessary to rely on the London IMA or the private firms for survival. They fiercely oppose any Exoduses, spreading propaganda on the evils effects of Exoduses on the Earth's environment, and using military force to prevent any attempted Exodus.

The story begins in a Domepolis in Siberia, where championship video game player Gainer Sanga is arrested by Siberian Railroad policewoman Adette Kistler on suspicion of being an Exodus member. Ironically he isn't, but his friends Sara Kodama and Bello Korissha along with his schoolteacher Mamado Azaf are members of the Gauli team, a militia unit of the local Exodus group. At the same time, Exodus expert and coordinator Gain Bijou lets himself be arrested by the Siberian Railroad police as part of his plan to infiltrate the city and steal an "Overman", which is a biomechanical giant robot, for use in defending the Exodus.

Gain is placed in the same prison cell as Gainer, and when Gain initiates his escape, only Gainer is willing to escape as well. They infiltrate the castle of Duke Medaiyu and steal an Overman in the Duke's secret museum collection, which Gainer logs into as his video game handle: "King Gainer". As Gainer gets the hang of piloting a real Overman, he and Gain encounter shut-in Princess Anna, the Duke's daughter, who supports the Exodus and wants to see the world and people other than her tutor, Lioubov Smettana. Using an annual festival presented by idol singer and co–Exodus leader, Meeya Laujin, as cover, the Exodus executes their plan: take much of the Domepolis, block by block, using heavy hauler machines called Silhouette Mammoths and move them over 3000 km across the Siberian tundra to their ancestral homeland, "Yapan". As the Exodus moves out, the Siberian Railroad police chief, Yassaba Jin, mobilizes his forces to stop them. Other obstacles to the Exodus are Kistler's and Jin's subordinates Jaboli Mariela, Kejinan Datto, and Enge Gam, Siberian Railroad president Kizz Munt, Saint Regan policemen Asuham Boone and Zakki Bronco, and Overman aces Cynthia Lane and Kashmir Valle.

Characters

Yapan Exodus
Gainer Sanga
 Voiced by: Hirofumi Nojima (Japanese), Darrel Guilbeau (English)

Gainer is the headstrong main protagonist of the series. He lived his days as a high school truant and online gaming champion before meeting Gain Bijou, an Exodus specialist under the captivity of the Siberian Railway forces. Gainer initially opposes the Yapan Exodus, but through a series of coincidences and his connections with Gain and Sara, he suddenly finds himself soldiering for their cause. He pilots the long-haired Overman dubbed 'King Gainer'.

Sara Kodama
 Voiced by: Ai Kobayashi (Japanese), Olivia O'Connor (English)

Sara Kodama is a diligent high school student and member of the Gauli Squad, a rebel soldier faction which supports the Yapan Exodus. Her work ethic is matched only by her heart, which she devotes mainly to Gainer. Her plan upon completion of the Yapan Exodus is to cultivate a farm.

Gain Bijou
 Voiced by: Otoya Kawano (Japanese), Ron Allen (English)

A self-proclaimed 'Exodus specialist', Gain is an expert sniper and important member of the Yapan Exodus. His nickname, 'Black Southern Cross', was earned by his reputation for leaving bullet wounds in the shape of a cross within his fallen enemies. His affable demeanor outside the battlefield is pierced upon discussion of his mysterious past.

Princess Ana Medaiyu
 Voiced by: Noriko Kito (Japanese), Michelle Ruff (English)

Princess Ana is the daughter of Duke Medaiyu. Her lively nature and insatiable curiosity lead her to join the Yapan Exodus under the guise of a hostage. She owns three intelligent pet squirrels that heed her every command.

Lioubov Smettana
 Voiced by: Ai Futamura (Japanese), Julie Ann Taylor (English)

Ana's kind, brave, and loyal retainer. She has trouble keeping up with the princess at times and wishes to protect her at all costs.

Adette Kistler
 Voiced by: Marika Hayashi (Japanese), Wendee Lee (English)

Adette debuts as a commander of the Siberian Railway forces, and infiltrates the traveling city units in order to capture Princess Ana. Gain quickly thwarts her attempt, and with nowhere else to go, she begrudgingly starts a new life on the Exodus as a high school teacher for Gainer and Sara's class. She's a tough and shrewd woman, but childlike in her temper and affection toward men.

Bello Korissha
 Voiced by: Shusaku Otake (Japanese), Derek Stephen Prince (English)

A fellow Gauli Squad member and classmate of Gainer and Sara. He has feelings for Sara, but never seems to show them outside random acts of jealously toward Gainer. Despite this, he remains good friends with Gainer and Sara and a helpful ally on the battlefield.

Meeya Laujin
 Voiced by: Yumiko Nakanishi (Japanese), Kate Davis (English)

Louvre Won Dara
 Voiced by: Masako Chiba (Japanese), Kate Davis (English)

Mamado Azaf
 Voiced by: Rintaro Nishi (Japanese), David Orozco (English)

Hughes Gauli
 Voiced by: Toru Kusano (Japanese), Tony Oliver (English)

Hughes is the commander of the Gauli Squad, trained in the way of the ninja. He'll stop at nothing to support the Yapan Exodus.

Cona Madaya
 Voiced by: Mayumi Honda (Japanese), Julie Maddalena (English)

Cona is the temperamental young mechanic who repairs the Silhouette machines and King Gainer. Early on, she competes with Lioubov for Gain's affection, but quickly moves on to capture the attention of Gain's former comrade.

Nann
 Voiced by: Jun Irie (Japanese), Midge Mayes (English)

Toun
 Voiced by: Yohei Obayashi (Japanese), Dave Mallow (English first), Jim Taggert (English second)

Elizabeth
 Voiced by: Tomoko Hayashi (Japanese), Alexu Greene (English)

Five Wisemen
Gach Wige
 Voiced by: Kazuhiko Kishino (Japanese), William Frederick Knight (English)

Citran Vie
 Voiced by: Naoki Shirakami (Japanese), Jane Alan (English)

Manman Douton
 Voiced by: Mugihito (Japanese), Anthony Mozdy (English first), Joey Lotsko (English second)

Pelhar Pey
 Voiced by: Hiroaki Harakawa (Japanese), Steve Kramer (English)

Wulgusk Domepolis
Duke Medaiyu
 Voiced by: Harumi Munechika (Japanese), Russel Thor (English)

Siberian Railroad Authority
Cynthia Lane
 Voiced by: Rena Mizuki (Japanese), Tara Malone (English)

During her first appearance, Cynthia is simply an online gaming buddy of Gainer's hidden behind a virtual avatar. However, it is discovered later on that she is part of the Siberian Railroad forces, raised and favored by Kizz Munt. She is almost always eating candy and seems to treat piloting as a game, as well as dating. Her trademark whimsy and inability to take things seriously comes with major consequences, as she ends up hurting a Gainer later in the series during a friendly piloting competition between Overmen. Cynthia's natural piloting ability is said to have come from her mother, whose name is never mentioned; her only living relative appears to be Martina Lane. The shape-shifting Dominator is her Overman of choice.

Yassaba Jin
 Voiced by: Hisao Egawa (Japanese), Michael McConnohie (English)

Kashmir Valle
 Voiced by: Keiji Fujiwara (Japanese), Chris Kent (English)

Jaboli Mariela
 Voiced by: Maki Tamura (Japanese), Mia Bradly (English)

Kejinan Datto
 Voiced by: Hiroshi Kitazawa (Japanese), David Lelyveld (English)

Kizz Munt
 Voiced by: Seiji Sasaki (Japanese), James Lyon (English)

Enge Gam
 Voiced by: Tsuyoshi Koyama (Japanese), Richard George (English)

Ariel Nielson
 Voiced by: Hiroshi Takahashi (Japanese), Kurt Strauss (English)

London IMA
Asuham Boone
 Voiced by: Takehito Koyasu (Japanese), Doug Erholtz (English)
Asuham is a recurring antagonist and member of the Saint Regan police force. His only real objective is to capture Gain and force him to confront his sister, Karin, who has conceived and raised Gain's child alone. He does so to the point of obsessiveness and madness until the very end of the series when Karin drags him home in an Overman, claiming to have no interest in Gain.

Zakki Bronco
 Voiced by: Takashi Nakamura (Japanese), Richard Hayworth (English)

Others
Karin Boone
 Voiced by: Fumiko Orikasa (Japanese), Lynn Fischer (English)

Karin is Asuham's sister and Gain's former lover. After a one-night stand, she ends up conceiving Gain's daughter; however, she has no lingering feelings for Gain and only appears to rescue Asuham.

Martina Lane
 Voiced by: Toshiko Sawada (Japanese), Barbara Goodson (English)

Game appearances
Overman King Gainer is included in Another Century's Episode 3 for the PlayStation 2 and Another Century's Episode R for the PlayStation 3. The series made its debut into the long-running Super Robot Wars series in Super Robot Wars Z and has also appeared in Super Robot Wars K for the Nintendo DS.

References

External links
  Overman King Gainer, official website
 

2002 anime television series debuts
2002 manga
Anime with original screenplays
Bandai Entertainment anime titles
Bandai Namco franchises
Mecha anime and manga
Seinen manga
Sentai Filmworks
Sunrise (company)
Television shows written by Ichirō Ōkouchi
Wowow original programming